Pima fulvirugella is a species of snout moth. It is found in North America, including Alberta and California.

References

Moths described in 1887
Phycitini
Pima (moth)